is the official Disney souvenir shop located in Urayasu, Chiba, Japan. The shop is shaped like an oversized suitcase and is open one hour longer than Tokyo Disneyland and Tokyo DisneySea. The shop has original goods as well as popular goods of Tokyo Disney Resort and the 2 parks. The shop is located outside the theme parks.

External links
Official site

Tokyo Disney Resort